Sir Luke Thompson (18 July 1867 – 15 January 1941) was a British coal merchant and Conservative politician.

Early life
Thompson was born on Chester Road, Bishopwearmouth, the son of John Thompson (1823–1883), a coal merchant, and his wife, Catherine (née Liddell, 1826–1915). After schooling, he became a ship's draughtsman before entering into the coal trade.

Politics
In the general election of 1922, Thompson was elected Member of Parliament for the two-seat constituency of Sunderland, alongside Walter Raine. Both defeated by the Labour politicians Marion Phillips and Alfred Smith in the general election of 1929, Thompson regained the seat in a by-election in 1931, following Smith's death. He then held the seat alongside Phillips, briefly, and then with Samuel Storey. Retaining the seat after the general election of 1931, he sat until the general election of 1935 when he retired.

Thompson was knighted by George V in 1934.

Death
Thompson was accidentally killed on 15 January 1941 in Sunderland, aged 73, according to Sir Cuthbert Headlam, Bart. after "trying to work a winch and [getting] caught up in the machinery." He was buried in Bishopwearmouth Cemetery with his wife's parents and siblings.

Family
On 19 October 1895, Thompson married Ann Trobe Potts (1869–1946) at Fawcett Street chapel, Sunderland. They had two daughters, Dorothy Trobe (1896–?) and Catherine (1900–?).

References

External links 
 

1867 births
1941 deaths
Conservative Party (UK) MPs for English constituencies
Knights Bachelor
People from Sunderland
Politicians from Tyne and Wear
UK MPs 1922–1923
UK MPs 1923–1924
UK MPs 1924–1929
UK MPs 1929–1931
UK MPs 1931–1935
Accidental deaths in England